Tom Green (13 January 1909 – 3 November 1979) was an  Australian rules footballer who played with Hawthorn in the Victorian Football League (VFL).

Notes

External links 

1909 births
1979 deaths
Players of Australian handball
Australian rules footballers from Victoria (Australia)
Hawthorn Football Club players